The Rich Man's House is the final novel by Australian author Andrew McGahan, published posthumously in September 2019. The author's note reads, in part:

Synopsis
McGahan constructs a world very similar to our own, varying only in the critical elements necessary for the setting of the novel. The world's tallest mountain is not Mount Everest, but an island peak known as 'The Wheel', of some twenty-five vertical kilometres, located hundreds of kilometres southwest of Tasmania. One man has reached the summit, the 'rich man' of the title, Walter Richman. Others, including George Mallory and Edmund Hillary have died in their attempts. In McGahan's world, Everest itself had been conquered by Tenzing Norgay and Tom Bourdillon. 

Following his achievement in 1975, Richman inherits the bulk of an immense fortune, and sometime around 2010, constructs his own house on, and within, an adjacent high peak, Observatory Mount, with views across to the Wheel. Rita Gausse is the daughter of the house's architect, who himself has died, apparently of natural causes, at the house. She is invited by Richman to see her father's work. As the days of her visit proceed, however, it becomes clear to Rita that there are many unsettling mysteries concerning Richman, his ascent of the Wheel, and indeed the house itself.

In her younger years, when she was estranged from her architect father and often under the influence of artificial stimulants, Rita had penned a book, The Spawn of Disparity, in which she postulated the existence of what is behind the indefinable sense that humans often feel in the presence of natural wonders. Indeed, she used the term 'presence' to label this quality which accompanies natural (but inorganic) phenomena, from mountains to surf breaks. 

At a moment when there are only six people, including Rita and Richman, within the vast house, nature appears to awake, initially in the form of a brief earth tremor. The second half of the novel deals with the climactic sequel to this awakening.

Reception
The book was published in September 2019, some seven months after McGahan's death from cancer at the age of 52. Reviews were generally favourable while noting the imperfection that the author himself acknowledged in his note:

In The Canberra Times, Anna Creer notes:

Richard Cotter, in The Sydney Arts Guide:

James Ley, writing in the Sydney Review of Books, notes:

References 

2019 Australian novels
Novels published posthumously
Allen & Unwin books